Fatema Nedham is a Paralympic athlete from Bahrain. She is the first female Paralympic athlete to win a medal at the Summer Paralympics for Bahrain. She represented the country at the 2016 Summer Paralympics in Rio de Janeiro, Brazil and she won the gold medal in the women's shot put F53 event with a throw of 4.76 metres. She was also the flag bearer for her country during the opening ceremony of the 2016 Summer Paralympics.

She also represented Bahrain at the 2008 Summer Paralympics in the women's discus throw F32–34/51–53 event without winning a medal. She also competed at the 2012 Summer Paralympics in the women's discus throw F51/52/53 and women's javelin throw F33/34/52/53 events, also without winning a medal.

At the 2017 World Para Athletics Championships held in London, United Kingdom, she won the gold medal in the women's shot put F53.

References

External links 
 

Living people
Year of birth missing (living people)
Place of birth missing (living people)
Paralympic athletes of Bahrain
Athletes (track and field) at the 2008 Summer Paralympics
Athletes (track and field) at the 2012 Summer Paralympics
Athletes (track and field) at the 2016 Summer Paralympics
Medalists at the 2016 Summer Paralympics
Paralympic gold medalists for Bahrain
Bahraini female shot putters
Female discus throwers
Female javelin throwers
Paralympic medalists in athletics (track and field)
Wheelchair discus throwers
Wheelchair shot putters
Wheelchair javelin throwers
Paralympic shot putters
Paralympic discus throwers
Paralympic javelin throwers
21st-century Bahraini women